The swimming competitions at the 2021 Junior Pan American Games in Cali took place 26 to 30 November 2021.

Events
Similar to the program's format in 2015, swimming features a total of 36 events (17 each for men and women and 2 mixed).  The following events will be contested (all pool events are long course, and distances are in metres unless stated):
Freestyle: 50, 100, 200, 400, 800, and 1,500;
Backstroke: 100 and 200;
Breaststroke: 100 and 200;
Butterfly: 100 and 200;
Individual medley: 200 and 400;
Relays: 4×100 free (including mixed), 4×200 free, 4×100 medley (including mixed)

Schedule

Medal summary

Medal table

Medalists

Men's events

 Swimmers who participated in the heats only and received medals.

Women's events

 Swimmers who participated in the heats only and received medals.

Mixed

Qualification
A total of 272 swimmers will qualify in the pool. As Host Country, Colombia automatically will qualify 14 male and 14 female competitors in the pool. Each National Olympic Committee (NOC) may use proven swim times attained during the qualification
period of those swimmers who have met the qualifying standards established by the UANA for the 2021 Junior Pan American Games at a competition recognized by the FINA. Each event (besides the relays) have an A standard (two entries allowed) or a B standard (one entry allowed). Countries not qualified can enter one male and one female swimmer through the universality rule.

Qualification system
A total of 272 swimmers will qualify. As Host Country, Colombia automatically will qualify 14 male and 14 female competitors in the pool.  Each National Olympic Committee (NOC) may use proven swim times attained during the qualification period of those swimmers who have met the qualifying standards established by the UANA for the 2021 Junior Pan American Games at a competition recognized by the FINA. Each event (besides the relays) have an A standard (two entries allowed) or a B standard (one entry allowed). Countries not qualified can enter one male and one female swimmer through the universality rule.

Swimming qualification times
The time standards (all long course) for the 2019 Pan American Games are:

Swimming
A total of 37 countries qualified swimmers or received universality spots. Only 326 of 350 quota spots were distributed. A total of 167 male swimmers and 159 swimmers were entered.

Participation

Participating nations
Athletes from—nations competed in swimming at the 2021 Junior Pan American Games

See also
Swimming at the 2021 Junior Pan American Games
Swimming at the 2020 Summer Olympics
Swimming at the Pan American Games

References

External links

 
Swimming
Pan American Games
Swimming
Pan American Games
2021
Qualification tournaments for the 2023 Pan American Games